The Squatter's Secret is a 1928 romantic adventure novel by Arthur Wright (1870-1932). Like most of Wright's novels, it appeared in serialised form in newspapers prior to publication.

References

External links
The Squatter's Secret at AustLit
The Squatter's Secret at National Archives of Australia
Serialised copy of story from 1927 - 9 April first installment, 16 April, 23 April, 30 April, 7 May, 14 May, 21 May, 28 May, 4 June, 18 June, 25 June, 2 July, 9 July, 16 July

1928 Australian novels
Australian adventure novels
Novels set in Australia
Novels first published in serial form